Old Homer Village Historic District is a national historic district located at Homer in Cortland County, New York.  The district includes the historic core of the village of Homer centered on the village green.  It includes a mix of residential, commercial, civic, and religious structures.  Residences are primarily 2-story frame structures and commercial structures are 2- and 3-story structures constructed of brick.  Included within the district is the Homer Town Hall (1908), the -story Jebediah Barber building (1863), 3-story Brockway Block (1887–1888), and residences dating to the 1810s.  Also located within the district boundaries is the U.S. Post Office (Homer, New York).

It was listed on the National Register of Historic Places in 1973.

Gallery

References

External links

Historic American Buildings Survey in New York (state)
Historic districts in Cortland County, New York
Historic districts on the National Register of Historic Places in New York (state)
National Register of Historic Places in Cortland County, New York
1973 establishments in New York (state)